The 1985 Bulgarian Cup Final was the 45th final of the Bulgarian Cup, and was contested between CSKA Sofia and Levski Sofia on 19 June 1985 at Vasil Levski National Stadium in Sofia. CSKA won the final 2–1.

Match
The game ran on high emotions fueled by the streak of consecutive victories of Levski over CSKA in the 2 years prior to the game. The controversial decisions of the referee led to confrontations both on the field and on the stands. By а decree of the Central Committee of the Bulgarian Communist Party some of the leading players both of the Levski and CSKA teams were suspended from the sport for different lengths, including in the case of Hristo Stoichkov for life. The championship title of the club for 1985 was suspended. However, the suspensions were lifted in 1986. PFC Levski Sofia was renamed to Vitosha, while CSKA was renamed to Sredets, with the previous names being restored in 1989.

Details

See also
1984–85 A Group
1985 Cup of the Soviet Army Final

References 

Bulgarian Cup finals
PFC CSKA Sofia matches
PFC Levski Sofia matches
Cup Final